Grand Avenue Historic District is a platted community located in north Fort Worth, Texas. It sits two miles northwest of the Tarrant County Courthouse.  The subdivision was platted in 1888.  It comprises the western edge
of the original subdivision of North Fort Worth where the street curves along the bluffs above the West Fork of the Trinity River.  The district encompasses the properties on both sides of Grand Avenue for approximately seven blocks. It was added to the National Register on March 1, 1990.

Photo gallery

See also

National Register of Historic Places listings in Tarrant County, Texas

References

External links

National Register of Historic Places in Fort Worth, Texas
Historic districts in Fort Worth, Texas
Historic districts on the National Register of Historic Places in Texas